Sport England is a non-departmental public body under the Department for Digital, Culture, Media and Sport. Its role is to build the foundations of a community sport system by working with national governing bodies of sport, and other funded partners, to grow the number of people doing sport; sustain participation levels; and help more talented people from all diverse backgrounds excel by identifying them early, nurturing them, and helping them move up to the elite level.

Chris Boardman is the Chairman of Sport England and Natalie Ceeney is Vice Chair.

Overview 
Sport England was established as the English Sports Council in September 1996 as an executive non-departmental public body by royal charter. It began operating in 1997 as Sport England. It has two statutory, functions: (1) a lottery distributor for sport; and (2) the protection of playing fields, through its role as a statutory consultee on planning applications that affect playing fields, under SI No. 1817 (1996). The funding it distributes comes from both HM Treasury and the National Lottery. Since 1997, it has invested over £2 billion of Lottery funds and £300 million from the Exchequer into sports in England.

Sport England is organised into nine regions. Following restructuring in 2009, its former regional sports boards have been disbanded and regional staffing considerably reduced. Closer working with the sports national governing bodies (NGBs) is key to its new strategy  to achieve its target of one million people doing more sport by 2012–13. 

It is encourages sports venues to enhance their development potential by registering under Sport England's SASP (significant areas for sport) programme as either a national or regional centre for their particular sport.

Its 'Active Places' website is designed to help the public find sports facilities anywhere in England. Searching can be through an interactive map, within a given locality or to discover more information about a known facility location.

In 2007 Sport England produced Active Design, which provided a set of design guidelines to help promote opportunities for sport and physical activity in the design and layout of new development. The guide was revised, retaining 'The 3 A's' and refining the criteria based approach to the Ten Principles of Active Design. The revised Active Design was published in 2015, and was supported by Public Health England.

Leadership
Derek Mapp resigned as Chair of Sport England on 29 November 2007 after 13 months in the post, claiming he had been forced to leave his position by James Purnell, the Secretary of State for Culture, Media and Sport, in a dispute over funding. Mapp was succeeded by Michael Farrar as interim Chair from December 2007 to March 2009. Purnell appointed Richard Lewis (former Chief Executive of the Rugby Football League) to review Sport England's funding priorities, and he was appointed Chair on 1 April 2009.

On 22 April 2013, Nick Bitel was appointed as new Chairman, succeeding Richard Lewis.

Clubmark
Clubmark is an accreditation which Sport England makes available to community sports clubs which fulfil certain criteria. Its declared aims are: "Higher standards of welfare, equity, coaching and management in community sports club" and "Making sure the nation's sports club infrastructure is safer, stronger and more successful".  over 12,000 clubs had the Clubmark accreditation.

Logo and branding
The Sport England logo is based on the 'sport for all' logo which was used from the 1970s onwards.

Awards and nominations

The Sports Council Archives
In 1997, the English Sports Council replaced the previous administrative body known as The Sports Council. The Sports Council was first appointed by the British government in 1965. Archives of The Sports Council are held at the Cadbury Research Library, University of Birmingham. The archives include administrative papers, reports, financial records, correspondence, and collected printed material from the 1940s to 2001.

See also 
 Sportsmark
 Sport in England

References

External links 
 

Department for Digital, Culture, Media and Sport
Non-departmental public bodies of the United Kingdom government
Organisations based in the London Borough of Camden
Sport England
Physical education in the United Kingdom
Sport in the London Borough of Camden
Sports organisations of England